Lenin's Kisses is a novel by the Chinese writer Yan Lianke, published in 2004.

Plot
A village collects funds for buying the corpse of Vladimir Lenin and to build a monument around it. The profits of the project consumes the village and the solidarity of its citizens. The chief of the district is able to make grand constructions, until his superiors find out what is happening

Themes
"That the dead body of socialism's most important role model is being commercialized, can serve as an illustration of the hypercapitalism of contemporary China", according to Klassekampen.

Translated publications
English: Lenin's Kisses (2013, by Carlos Rojas)
French: Bons baisers de Lénine (2009, by Sylvie Gentil)
Norwegian: Lenins kyss (2011 - from French, by Tom Lotherington)
Swedish: Lenins kyssar (2015, by Anna Gustafsson Chen)

References

2004 Chinese novels
Novels by Yan Lianke
Novels set in China